SLX  may refer to:
A Shimano bicycle groupset
Acura SLX, a Honda SUV
Montello SLX, a Pinarello bicycle frameset
Parsol SLX, a brand of Polysilicone-15, used in hair products
 Salt Cay Airport